is a retired Japanese women's professional shogi player ranked 4-dan.

Personal life
Fujimori's son Tetsuya is also a professional shogi player. The two are the only mother and son to be awarded professional shogi player status.

Promotion history
Fujimori's promotion history was as follows.
1979, November 8: 2-kyū
1980, February 26: 1-dan
1989, May 22: 2-dan
2000, April 1: 3-dan
2010, April: 4-dan

Note: All ranks are women's professional ranks.

Awards and honors
Fujimori received the Japan Shogi Association's received the "25 Years Service Award" in recognition of being an active professional for twenty-five years in 2003.

References

External links
 公益社団法人日本女子プロ将棋協会: 所属棋士 

Japanese shogi players
Living people
Retired women's professional shogi players
LPSA
Professional shogi players from Saitama Prefecture
1961 births